Interogo Holding A.G. is a holding company that is fully owned by the Interogo Foundation. The business focus is on property investments and financial investments. The company was created after it was spun-off from Inter IKEA Holding.

History
The company was founded in 2016 after the Interogo Foundation split it non-IKEA related companies away from the IKEA related companies (Inter IKEA Holding) into Interogo Holding A.G. These including primarily of property and financial investments.

Subsidiaries

Vastint Holding
Vastint Holding B.V. develops and manages property in Europe. It focuses on the development of commercial property, this includes the selling and developing residential properties. They manage and/or developed several offices, hotels and residential. The company was founded in 1989. It is based out of The Netherlands.

Inter Fund Management 
Inter Fund Management S.A. manages funds on behalf of subsidiaries of Interogo Foundation. These primary consist of the brands relating to the IKEA brand, such as Inter Ikea Holding and its subsidiaries. It was founded in 1998 and has 50 workers. It is based out of Luxembourg.

Nalka Invest
Nalka Invest A.B. is an investment firm that invest in small and medium-sized businesses generally in the Nordic region. It invest in private companies and buys a majority or monitory size share. It was founded in 2015 and is based in Stockholm, Sweden. Some of their investments include Cibes Lift, Lekolar, Eson Pac, Brunngard, Intrac and others. They have a total of 12 companies in their portfolio, all of which are Nordic. They have also exited some partnerships including ones with Hermods, Scorett and others. The company has 14 staff or 2600 staff when including their entire portfolio.

References

IKEA
Companies of Switzerland
Swiss companies established in 2016